Pavlina Chilingirova (also Pavlina Angelova; born 22 October 1955) is a Bulgarian chess player who holds the FIDE title of Woman International Master (WIM, 1982). She is a Bulgarian Women Chess Champion (1993).

Biography
In the 1980s and 1990s, she was one of the leading Bulgarian women's chess players. Chilingirova has participated in many Bulgarian women's chess championships where she won gold (1993), 2 silver (1981, 2007) and 6 bronzes (1980, 1986, 1989, 1990, 2004, 2006) medals. Several times she played in the Women's World Chess Championships zonal tournaments (1981, 1987, 1993, 1995). In 1988, Chilingirova won Dortmund international women's tournament. In 2007, she won Open Women Bulgarian Championship.

Chilingirova played for Bulgaria in the Women's Chess Olympiads:
 In 1980, at first reserve board in the 9th Chess Olympiad (women) in Valletta (+1, =4, -1),
 In 1982, at first reserve board in the 10th Chess Olympiad (women) in Lucerne (+5, =2, -3),
 In 1984, at third board in the 26th Chess Olympiad (women) in Thessaloniki (+5, =7, -0) and won team silver medal,
 In 1986, at third board in the 27th Chess Olympiad (women) in Dubai (+6, =2, -2),
 In 1988, at second board in the 28th Chess Olympiad (women) in Thessaloniki (+4, =2, -4),
 In 1990, at third board in the 29th Chess Olympiad (women) in Novi Sad (+5, =4, -1),
 In 1992, at third board in the 30th Chess Olympiad (women) in Manila (+6, =1, -4),
 In 1994, at first reserve board in the 31st Chess Olympiad (women) in Moscow (+2, =1, -4).

She played for Bulgaria in the European Team Chess Championships:
 In 1992, at fourth board in the 1st European Team Chess Championship (women) in Debrecen (+1, =0, -2),
 In 2007, at first reserve board in the 7th European Team Chess Championship (women) in Heraklion (+5, =1, -1) and won individual silver medal.

In 1982, Chilingirova was awarded the FIDE Woman International Master (WIM) title.

References

External links
 
 
 

1955 births
Living people
Bulgarian female chess players
Chess Woman International Masters
Chess Olympiad competitors